Pidonia quadrata is a species of the Lepturinae subfamily in the long-horned beetle family. This beetle is distributed in Canada, and the United States.

References

Lepturinae
Beetles described in 1931